Barbacenia is a plant genus in the family Velloziaceae, described as a genus in 1788. The entire genus is endemic to Brazil with the exception of B. celiae, which crosses the border into Venezuela.

 Species

References 

Velloziaceae
Pandanales genera